The old Cordilleran culture, also known as the Cascade phase, is an ancient culture of Native Americans that settled in the Pacific Northwestern region of North America that existed from 9000 or 10000 BC until about 5500 BC.  

The Cascade phase may be even older, depending on when human beings first arrived in America. They originated in Alaska, and migrated to occupy a wide area as far as Idaho and the plateaus of California, but they are generally not considered to be a maritime society. However, their spear points, or points resembling theirs, have been found as far south as Mexico and South America. These tools were used as spears or darts, or also knives, indicating the importance of hunting, although they also fished and gathered for subsistence. However, the main dependence was on land hunting, mostly of deer, bison, and other large mammals.  

The culture possibly spoke a Macro-Penutian language (a hypothetical macrofamily which may include Penutian, Uto-Aztecan, and some other language families).  This culture also created the oldest attested examples of art in the Pacific Northwest.

See also
 Cascade point

Notes

Archaeology of the United States
Archaeological cultures of North America
History of indigenous peoples of the Pacific Northwest
10th-millennium BC establishments